Carlos Javier Matheu (born 13 May 1985) is an Argentine professional footballer who plays as a centre back for Quilmes Atlético Club.

Career

Club career
Matheu made his professional debut in 2004 in Club Atletico Independiente, and soon established himself as a member of the first team squad. In the Apertura 2007 he chipped in with 4 goals in 15 games, a useful return for a defender.

He nearly moved to Lokomotiv Moscow for $3.3million (£1.6million) in July 2008 but chose to play for Cagliari  instead. He was now repurchased by Independiente for 1.5 million dollars for the 50% of his rights (Independiente already owned 50%). After one season in Italy, he returned to Independiente.

At the end of the 2011–12 season, Matheu's contract expired and he returned to Italy, signing a contract with Atalanta.

On 30 August 2013, the Siena board announced the loan signing of Matheu until the end of the season.

On 1 January 2016, Matheu signed for Argentine club CA Banfield.

International career
Matheu received his first call-up to the Argentina squad for the friendly against Costa Rica on 26 January 2010.

Honours
Independiente
Copa Sudamericana (1): 2010

Peñarol
Uruguayan Primera División: 2018

References

External links
 Argentine Primera statistics  
 
 Football-Lineups player profile
 

1985 births
Living people
People from Quilmes
Argentine footballers
Argentine expatriate footballers
Argentina international footballers
Association football defenders
Club Atlético Independiente footballers
Cagliari Calcio players
Atalanta B.C. players
A.C.N. Siena 1904 players
Defensa y Justicia footballers
Club Atlético Banfield footballers
Club Atlético Huracán footballers
Unión Española footballers
Quilmes Atlético Club footballers
Argentine Primera División players
Chilean Primera División players
Uruguayan Primera División players
Serie A players
Serie B players
Expatriate footballers in Chile
Expatriate footballers in Uruguay
Expatriate footballers in Italy
Argentine expatriate sportspeople in Chile
Argentine expatriate sportspeople in Uruguay
Argentine expatriate sportspeople in Italy
Sportspeople from Buenos Aires Province